Thorn(s) or The Thorn(s) may refer to:

Botany
 Thorns, spines, and prickles, sharp structures on plants
 Crataegus monogyna, or common hawthorn, a plant species

Comics and literature
 Rose and Thorn, the two personalities of two DC Comics characters
 Thorn (Marvel Comics), a fictional character from Marvel Comics
 Thornn, a fictional character from Marvel Comics
 Thorn (Inheritance), a dragon from the Inheritance cycle
 Thorns (novel), a 1967 science fiction novel by Robert Silverberg
 Thorn, a 1982–1986 comic strip by Jeff Smith
 Thorn Harvestar, a main character in Jeff Smith's Bone series
 "The Thorn", a poem by William Wordsworth in Lyrical Ballads, 1798

Companies, organisations and teams
 Thorn (organization), an anti-human-trafficking organization
 Thorn Electrical Industries, an electrical engineering business
 Thorn EMI, a major British company involved in consumer electronics, music, defence and retail
 Thorn Lighting, luminaire manufacturer, part of Zumtobel Lighting Group
 Portland Thorns FC, a NWSL soccer team based in Portland, Oregon, US

Film and television
 The Thorn (film), a 1974 American comedy film
 The Thorns (TV series), a 1988 American sitcom

Individuals
 Thorn (dog), a WWII rescue dog, later a canine actor
 Thorn (surname), list of people and fictional characters so named

Linguistics
 Thorn (letter) (Þ, þ), a letter of the Anglo-Saxon and Icelandic alphabets
 Thorn (rune) (ᚦ), or Thurisaz, a rune of the Anglo-Saxon fuþorc

Music

Performers
 Thorns (band), a Norwegian black metal band
 The Thorns (band), an American acoustic rock band

Albums
 Thorn (album), by Tang Dynasty, 2013
 Thorns (Beans album), 2007
 Thorns (Icon & The Black Roses album), 2014
 Thorns (Thorns album), 2001
 Thorns (Tony Martin album), 2022
 The Thorns (album), by the Thorns, 2003

EPs
 The Thorn (EP), by Siouxsie and the Banshees, 1984
 Thorn, an EP by Enslaved, 2011
 Thorns, an EP by Luke Black, 2015

Songs
 "Thorn", by Blind Guardian from Nightfall in Middle-Earth, 1998
 "Thorn", by My Bloody Valentine from You Made Me Realise, 1988
 "Thorn", by Underoath from Voyeurist, 2022
 "Thorns", by Demon Hunter from Storm the Gates of Hell, 2007
 "Thorns", by Phinehas from The Fire Itself, 2021

Places

Europe
 Thorn, Bedfordshire, England
 Thorn, Netherlands
 Toruń, Poland

United States
 Whitethorn, California (formerly Thorn)
 Thorn, Mississippi
 Thorn Creek, a stream in Will County, Illinois
 Thorn Lake (disambiguation), bodies of water in Oregon and Wisconsin

See also
 
 
 Thorne (disambiguation)
 Thorn tree (disambiguation)